Jocara is a genus of snout moths. It was described by Francis Walker in 1863.

Species
 Jocara abachuma
 Jocara aidana
 Jocara albiferalis
 Jocara albimedialis
 Jocara albimedialis
 Jocara amazonalis
 Jocara anacita
 Jocara anastasia
 Jocara andeola
 Jocara ansberti
 Jocara athanasia
 Jocara basilata
 Jocara breviornatalis (Grote, 1877)
 Jocara bryoxantha
 Jocara cacalis (C. Felder, R. Felder & Rogenhofer, 1875)
 Jocara cantianilla
 Jocara chlorisalis
 Jocara chrysoderas
 Jocara claudalis
 Jocara cononalis
 Jocara conrana
 Jocara conspicualis Lederer, 1863
 Jocara cristalis C. Felder, R. Felder & Rogenhofer, 1875
 Jocara dapha
 Jocara desideria
 Jocara extensa (Walker, 1863)
 Jocara fragilis Walker, 1863
 Jocara francesca
 Jocara fuscifusalis
 Jocara gillalis
 Jocara hemizonalis
 Jocara hispida (Dognin, 1906)
 Jocara hospitia
 Jocara lactiferalis
 Jocara lutosalis (Amsel, 1956)
 Jocara majuscula
 Jocara malrubia
 Jocara marchiana
 Jocara maroa
 Jocara martinia
 Jocara maurontia
 Jocara mava
 Jocara mediosinalis
 Jocara monosemia
 Jocara multicolor
 Jocara nana
 Jocara nigripuncta
 Jocara nigrisquama
 Jocara noloides
 Jocara oduvalda
 Jocara oediperalis
 Jocara olivescens
 Jocara pagiroa
 Jocara parallelalis
 Jocara pictalis
 Jocara prudentia
 Jocara pyropicta
 Jocara ragonoti
 Jocara raymonda
 Jocara rubralis
 Jocara rufitinctalis (Hampson, 1906)
 Jocara sara
 Jocara sisinnia
 Jocara subcurvalis
 Jocara subfusca
 Jocara suiferens
 Jocara tenebrosa
 Jocara terrenalis
 Jocara thermochroalis
 Jocara theliana
 Jocara thilloa
 Jocara trabalis
 Jocara translinea
 Jocara umbrosalis
 Jocara venezuelensis
 Jocara yva
 Jocara zetila

References

External links
 
 
 

 
Pyralidae genera